Oliver Smith (born 29 May 1952) is an English actor. He is known for playing the role of Frank the Monster from the original Hellraiser film in 1987, as well as Mr. Browning and Skinless Frank from Hellbound: Hellraiser II film in 1988. In May–June 2010, Smith narrated the commercial for the DVD and Blu-ray releases of Life.

As Frank the Monster
Oliver Smith's role in the original Hellraiser film is as Frank (the main villain in Hellraiser) after he is slain by Pinhead. Actor Sean Chapman plays Frank in his living state in the early stages of the film.

Filmography
Jesus of Nazareth (1977), Saul
The First Great Train Robbery (1979), Ratting Assistant
Porridge (1979), McMillan
Riding High (1981), Burt Ganja
Hellraiser (1987), Zombified Frank / Frank the Monster
Hellbound: Hellraiser II (1988), Browning / Skinless Frank
Tale of a Vampire (1992), Bum

Television/Commercial
Life (2010) – Male Narration (commercialised) (uncredited)

References

External links

1952 births
English male film actors
English male television actors
Living people